Colby Hackett Chandler (1925/6 – March 4, 2021) was the chairman and chief executive officer of the Eastman Kodak Company.

He was a graduate of the University of Maine and received his Master's degree in Management (M.B.A.) from the Sloan Fellows program of the MIT Sloan School of Management.

Chandler was also a member of the board of trustees of the Rochester Institute of Technology (RIT). He joined the board in 1974, and served as chairman of the board from 1992 to 1994.

References

1920s births
2021 deaths
MIT Sloan School of Management alumni
MIT Sloan Fellows
American chief executives of Fortune 500 companies
University of Maine alumni
Kodak people
Year of birth uncertain
Rochester Institute of Technology people